Malate dehydrogenase, cytoplasmic also known as malate dehydrogenase 1 is an enzyme that in humans is encoded by the MDH1 gene.

Function 

Malate dehydrogenase catalyzes the reversible oxidation of malate to oxaloacetate, utilizing the NAD/NADH cofactor system in the citric acid cycle. The protein encoded by this gene is localized to the cytoplasm and may play pivotal roles in the malate-aspartate shuttle that operates in the metabolic coordination between cytosol and mitochondria. Alternatively spliced transcript variants encoding distinct isoforms have been found for this gene.

Regulation 

The acetylation of MDH1 activates its enzymatic activity and enhance intracellular levels of NADPH, which promotes adipogenic differentiation.

Methylation on arginine 248 (R248) negatively regulates MDH1. Protein arginine methyltransferase 4 (PRMT4/CARM1) methylates and inhibits MDH1 by disrupting its dimerization. Arginine methylation of MDH1 represses mitochondria respiration and inhibits glutamine utilization. CARM1-mediated MDH1 methylation reduces cellular NADPH level and sensitizes cells to oxidative stress. Besides, MDH1 methylation suppresses cell growth and clonogenic activity. R248 of MDH1 is hypomethylated in pancreatic ductal adenocarcinoma.

Interactive pathway map

References

Further reading